Let's Tie the Knot, Honey! (Spanish: ¿Nos casamos? Sí, mi amor) is a 2022 Peruvian romantic comedy film directed by Pedro Flores Maldonado and written by Maldonado & Yiddá Eslava. It is a sequel to the 2020 Peruvian film Sí, mi amor.

Synopsis 
Guille decides that it is time to take the next step and so he seeks to ask his beloved to marry him, but things get complicated and nothing goes as planned.

Cast 
The actors participating in this film are:

 Yiddá Eslava as Bea
 Julián Zucchi as Guille
 Andrés Salas as Max
 Magdyel Ugaz as Ceci
 Pietro Sibille as Alejandro
 Saskia Bernaola as Marisol

Release 
Let's Tie the Knot, Honey! premiered on Febreary 3, 2022 in Peruvian theaters. Like its ancestor, Netflix acquires the international distribution rights of the film and will premiere it on its platform on May 6, 2022.

Reception 
In its first weekend in theaters, the film drew over 50,000 viewers. Quickly, the film surpassed 200,000 viewers, becoming the second highest grossing Spanish-language film in South America after the reopening of theaters (2021-2022).

References

External links 

 

2022 films
2022 romantic comedy films
Peruvian romantic comedy films
Wallaz Producciones films
2020s Peruvian films
2020s Spanish-language films

Films set in Peru
Films shot in Peru
Films about weddings
Peruvian sequel films